Ava is an unincorporated community in northwestern Noble Township, Noble County, Ohio, United States.  It has a post office with the ZIP code 43711.  Another location in Ava is a small museum dedicated to the nearby crash of the airship USS Shenandoah in 1925.

History
Ava was laid out in 1873. The community was a station and shipping point on the Cleveland & Marietta Railroad.

References

Unincorporated communities in Ohio
Unincorporated communities in Noble County, Ohio